Sitara-e-Shujaat, sometimes spelled Sitara-i-Shujaat, is the second-highest civil award for bravery bestowed by the Islamic Republic of Pakistan. It is usually awarded to the Pakistani citizens such as civilians, human rights defenders, military or law enforcement officials for their bravery contributions to the national interest of the country, and while the award seeks to recognize the "gallantry contributions", it is also awarded posthumously by the president annually on the Pakistan Day.

After a citizen's contribution to security, defence and health among others is recognized, whether it is a government or non-government duty, the respective state governments prepares recommendation list to the federal government for final approval. After it is sent to the government, the prime minister recommends or advises the awardees list to the president.

Announcement criteria 
It is officially announced on the Independence day and is presented annually on the Pakistan Day. Before it is awarded to the eligible individuals, it is sent to the
Cabinet of Pakistan by 15 April.

History 
Sitara-e-Shujaat and other civil awards were established on 23 March 1956, nine years after the partition of the Indian subcontinent. It came into existence under the Article 259 (2) and Decorations Act, 1975 of the constitution of Pakistan.
Iqbal Masih was honored with it on March 23, 2022.

References 

Civil awards and decorations of Pakistan
Awards established in 1957
1957 establishments in Pakistan